A monitum is a warning issued by the Congregation for the Doctrine of the Faith to an errant cleric, who is in danger of receiving an additional penalty.

Notable cases

Teilhard de Chardin
The writings, not named but described as "gaining a good deal of success", including some published posthumously, of Pierre Teilhard de Chardin were the subject of a monitum by the Holy Office in June 1962, seven years after Teilhard's death.

The Danube Seven
The Danube Seven – seven women on whom Rómulo Antonio Braschi, the founder of a schismatic community, attempted to confer priestly ordination on June 29, 2002 – were the target of a  monitum dated 10 July 2002. The women were: Christine Mayr-Lumetzberger, Adelinde Theresia Roitinger, Gisela Forster, Iris Müller, Ida Raming, Pia Brunner, and Angela White (pseudonym of Dagmar Braun Celeste).

Hans Küng
In 1975, the CDF issued a monitum against certain of Hans Küng's writings.

Form criticism
In 1961, the Holy Office issued a monitum against the use of form criticism in Catholic scriptural interpretation.

Vernacular publications of the Bible
In 1856, a monitum was published under Pope Pius IX which re-iterated the ban on publishing vernacular editions of the Bible which had not been approved by the Pope or the competent church authority.

See also

 Vetitum

References

Dicastery for the Doctrine of the Faith
Catholic penal canon law